Takvam Station was a railway station located at Takvam in Bergen, Norway that closed on 9 December 2012. Prior to closure, the station was served by two daily departures per direction by the Bergen Commuter Rail operated by Norges Statsbaner. The station opened in 1966, replacing the former Herland Station.

References

Other sources
Nils Carl Aspenberg (1999)  Fra Roa til Bergen. Historien om Bergensbanen (Oslo: Baneforlaget) .

Railway stations on Bergensbanen
Railway stations opened in 1966
Railway stations in Bergen
Disused railway stations in Norway
Railway stations closed in 2012